First National Bank of Rochester–Old Monroe County Savings Bank Building is a historic bank building located at Rochester in Monroe County, New York. It is currently home to Lifetime Financial Group, LLC. It was built in 1924 for the Monroe County Savings Bank in the Classical Revival style.  The State Street facade is built of dressed marble and is composed of a Corinthian order hexastyle portico in antis, supporting an entablature with pediment and an elevated attic story.  The interior of the bank consists of a large central banking room with a 52-foot-high cove ceiling with a rectangular skylight and Corinthian order details.

It was listed on the National Register of Historic Places in 1985.

References

Commercial buildings in Rochester, New York
Bank buildings on the National Register of Historic Places in New York (state)
Neoclassical architecture in New York (state)
Commercial buildings completed in 1924
National Register of Historic Places in Rochester, New York